Jan Howard (born Lula Grace Johnson; March 13, 1929 – March 28, 2020) was an American author, as well as a country music singer and songwriter. As a singer, she placed 30 singles on the Billboard country songs chart, was a Grand Ole Opry member and was nominated for several major awards. As a writer, she wrote poems and published an autobiography. She was married to country songwriter Harlan Howard.

Howard was mostly raised in West Plains, Missouri. The family moved to various homes during her childhood. Marrying in her teens, Howard and her husband relocated various times, including Colorado, Kansas, Illinois, and Missouri. She took several part-time jobs to support her growing family, which included three children. Howard divorced her first husband in 1953. She met and married her second husband the same year. Moving to his military base, the couple and her three children lived a suburban lifestyle. In 1955, Howard discovered that he was a bigamist and she resettled with her children in Los Angeles, California.

In 1957, she met and married Harlan Howard. Early in their marriage, he discovered that she could sing. Impressed by her voice, Harlan arranged for her to record demonstration tapes. These tapes were heard by other country artists and led to her first recording contract with Challenge Records. Howard had her first major country hit in 1960 with "The One You Slip Around With". As her husband's songwriting became more successful, Howard's recording career followed suit. She had her biggest success after signing with Decca Records. Howard had major hits with the singles "Evil on Your Mind" (1966) and "My Son" (1968). She also had several hits after teaming up with Bill Anderson, including the number-one hit "For Loving You" (1967). The pair continued recording and touring together until the mid-1970s.

By 1973, two of Howard's children had died and she divorced Harlan Howard. In a depressive state, she nearly gave up her career. Upon the encouragement of other performers, she released several more albums and singles into the 1980s. At the same time, she began devoting time to other interests including writing. In 1987, Howard published her best-selling autobiography entitled Sunshine and Shadow. She also started writing poems and short stories, and remained active in other ways, including regular appearances on the Grand Ole Opry. She also worked with United States military veterans through various programs. She donated to charities and spoke at fundraisers.

Early life

1929–1945: Childhood and teenage years
Jan Howard was born Lula Grace Johnson in West Plains, Missouri, the daughter of Linnie and Rolla Johnson. She was the eighth of 11 children. Two of her siblings died before the age of two. Howard's father was a brick mason who received employment assistance from the Works Progress Administration during the Great Depression. In her early childhood, the family moved frequently, as her father found work and better housing. They lived in nearby towns such as Kansas City, Birch Tree, and Oklahoma City. When she was eight years old, the family briefly returned to West Plains. After returning, Howard was raped by a family friend. In her 1987 autobiography, she commented on the experience: "My body was violated and my mind was damaged in a way I wasn't to know the full extent of for years to come." She kept it a secret from her family for many years.

During childhood, she developed an interest in listening to the Grand Ole Opry radio broadcasts with her father. The pair often tuned to hear Opry star, Texas Ruby perform. In 1943, Howard's mother temporarily separated from her father. To help support the family, Howard worked as a dishwasher in a local cafe. Because the cafe owner could not afford to pay her, he gave Howard's family food for weekly meals. At age 16, she took a job at a drugstore.

In 1945, she married Mearle Wood and subsequently dropped out of high school. Wood enrolled in the military soon after their marriage began. Finding military housing for his wife, Wood resettled the couple to Waynesville, Missouri. In their first home together, they shared a house with another military couple. She briefly returned to her parents' house after discovering Wood was engaging in an affair. However, when Wood was restationed in Little Rock, Arkansas, Howard reunited with him in his new location.

1946–1957: Early adulthood
Howard gave birth to three sons between the late 1940s and early 1950s. The young family continued to move as Wood took on various jobs. Among the cities they lived in were Colorado Springs, Colorado, Pittsburg, Kansas, and Greeley, Colorado. While in Greeley, the family's house caught on fire. According to Howard, she woke to the smell of smoke in the middle of the night and saved her three children from the fumes. Wood was not present at the time of the incident. The family eventually moved back to West Plains. Wood had becoming increasingly physically abusive towards Howard. During one incident, Wood held a butcher knife to Howard's throat, nearly killing her. His actions were interrupted when a friend knocked on the front door of their house. The same day, Howard and her three sons fled to her family's home in Oklahoma. "Until midnight, Mom and Daddy kept us hidden. Then, with as much money as we could spare, we boarded a Greyhound bus for Oklahoma City," Howard wrote. In 1953, she divorced Wood.

While living with her brother, Howard became acquainted with his friend, Lowell "Smitty" Smith. Smith was also an active member of the military. Developing a romantic affection, the two married in 1953. The family moved with Smith to a suburban neighborhood on a military base. Howard also got a part-time job in the "tea room" of the Morehouse Fashion Department Store. In 1954, she gave birth to a fourth child named Janet Louise Smith. The child had a series of medical problems and died shortly after being born. "They were closing the top of the incubator. The realization hit me. The baby was dead," she later recalled.

The family then rented a newly-built home on a military base in Warrensburg, Missouri. The couple bought furniture on credit to decorate the home. She also became pregnant again and eventually miscarried the child. Shortly after the miscarriage, Smith was re-stationed in Panama. While Smith moved to, Howard began preparing to join him there. However, she soon discovered that he was still married to another woman. Upon realizing this, she ended the relationship and moved with her sons to Los Angeles, California, in 1955.

Howard worked a series of part-time jobs upon moving to Los Angeles. This included a brief stint as a cocktail waitress in a strip club. "I must have had 30 jobs in the next 30 days," Howard wrote. She eventually got a job as a secretary. She later recalled that the position was challenging because she could not "type or take shorthand". In 1957, she met aspiring country music songwriter, Harlan Howard. The pair met through her friend's association with country artist Wynn Stewart (Stewart was also a friend of Howard's). Within a month of meeting, the couple were married on May 10, 1957 in Las Vegas, Nevada.

Singing career

1958–1963: Early success
At home, Howard would often sing to herself while carrying on domestic duties. Arriving home early one day, Harlan heard his wife singing when he walked in. "I didn't know you could sing," he said. The same day, he accompanied Jan on guitar while she sang his composition "Mommy for a Day". Harlan realized he could use his wife's singing voice for demonstration records. The Howard's recorded the demonstration tape in their bathroom in Gardena, California. It was then sent to a publisher in Nashville, Tennessee, where it was recorded and made a hit by Kitty Wells. Howard also sang the demos for "Pick Me Up on Your Way Down" and "I Wish I Could Fall in Love Again". Both songs were recorded by Charlie Walker. Harlan brought his wife's demo tapes to Joe Johnson of Challenge Records. Johnson liked the songs, but Harlan would not let Johnson take them unless he signed her to the label. Johnson agreed and she officially signed with the label in 1958. After signing, the label changed her name from "Lula Grace Howard" to "Jan Howard".

Howard was then paired with California country artist, Wynn Stewart and together they recorded several duets. Their first recording, "Yankee Go Home", was released as a single by Challenge Records in 1959. The duo also released a second single entitled "Wrong Company". The song received airplay on country radio stations and peaked at number 26 on the Billboard Hot Country and Western Sides chart in 1960. At the same time, Harlan's songwriting career was also taking off. This prompted the couple to frequent Los Angeles country music clubs. From interacting with other country artists at clubs, Jan was presented with performance opportunities of her own. Among her first engagements was singing on the regional television show Town Hall Party. However, Jan had fears about performing. In her autobiography, Howard recalled the experience at the show. "The band started 'Pick Me Up on Your Way Down' and someone pushed me onstage. After that, everything was a total blank...If I'd been given warning, I'd have been long gone."

The success of "Wrong Company" also prompted Joe Johnson to find Jan a solo release. Johnson chose the song "The One You Slip Around With", which was co-written by Harlan Howard and Fuzzy Owen. Released in late 1959, the song reached number 13 on the Billboard country sides chart in 1960. She recalled hearing the song on the radio for the first time: "For once, I was proud of what I heard but it was as though I was listening to someone else, not me." The song's success helped Howard receive the "Most Promising Country Female" award from both Billboard and Jukebox Operators. The Howard family also moved to Nashville in 1960, where Jan regularly appeared on the "Prince Albert" segment of the Grand Ole Opry. Howard met several country artists while playing there regularly, notably Patsy Cline. The two would become close friends.

The Howards bought a four-bedroom home located in Madison, a suburb of Nashville. Harlan converted the home's garage into a den to use as songwriting space. Still on Challenge Records, Jan continued to record demo material for her husband. Among the demos she performed on was "I Fall to Pieces", which Harlan composed with Hank Cochran. Jan liked the song so much that she wanted to record it for her own label. However, Harlan offered the track to Patsy Cline first. Cline's version became a hit. When not recording demos or at her new home, Jan toured package shows with other country artists. Among the first tours she embarked on was one in Florida alongside June Carter, Skeeter Davis, George Jones, Buck Owens, and Faron Young.

In 1962, Capitol Records bought Jan's recording contract from Challenge. According to Jan, her first Capitol sessions with an unnamed producer were "a disaster". Frustrated, she called Ken Nelson and asked him to record her instead. Nelson agreed and sent her to Los Angeles for their next session. At Capitol, it was suggested that she would be marketed as towards pop rather than country, which prompted Nelson to have her record a mix of pop standards and country covers. From the sessions, Howard's debut studio album was released in 1962, Sweet and Sentimental. The album featured covers of various songs, including her husband's "He Called Me Baby" and "Heartaches by the Number". Despite several recordings at Capitol, Howard only had one charting single with the label: a cover of "I Wish I Was a Single Girl Again". The song reached number 27 on the Billboard country sides chart in 1963.

1964–1974: Peak commercial success
By 1964, Jan's singing career was gaining more momentum. Because of her touring schedule, she hired a housekeeper to take care of domestic needs. Harlan Howard also found a booking agent for her shows. He arranged for Hubert Long (owner of the "Hubert Long Talent Agency") to work with his wife. According to Jan, Long booked many dates because the Howards owed the IRS $20,000 in back taxes. At concerts, she was making an estimated $500–600 a gig. At the same time, Harlan helped his wife secure a new recording contract with Decca Records in 1964. She was soon working under the guidance of producer, Owen Bradley. Her first Decca release was the single "What Makes a Man Wander". It reached the top 25 of the Billboard Hot Country Singles chart in 1965. Bradley and Jan had trouble finding a quality single for her next release. They soon found a song written by Harlan called "Evil on Your Mind". Jan and Bradley liked the song and thought it could be a hit. Released as a single in 1966, "Evil on Your Mind" reached number five on the Billboard country singles chart. "Evil on Your Mind" became her highest-charting solo single. Since its release, it has been considered her signature song. Its success prompted Decca to issue her second studio album. In September 1966, Jan Howard Sings Evil on Your Mind peaked at number 10 on the Billboard Top Country Albums chart.

The success of "Evil on Your Mind" led to an increased demand for Howard's concert bookings. "If I thought I'd been busy before, it was a vacation compared to now," Howard wrote. In 1966, she played a tour alongside other artists that ended at the Hollywood Bowl in California. She also played a show in Detroit, Michigan that attracted roughly 24,000 people. While not touring, Howard was in the recording studio. Her next single release was "Bad Seed", which reached number ten on the Billboard country chart in 1966. An album of the same name followed in 1967 that reached number 13 on the country albums chart. Her fourth studio album, This Is Jan Howard Country, was released in October 1967 and reached the top ten on the Billboard country chart. Her further hit singles during this time included "Roll Over and Play Dead" (1967), "Any Old Way You Do" (1967), and "Count Your Blessings, Woman" (1968). Music writers and critics took notice of her material as well. In Billboards 1968 review, one writer called her singing to be "loaded with sincerity and heart." Nashville music journalist Robert K. Oermann wrote in 2003, "Jan specialized in up-tempo tunes, usually filled with feisty female lyrics provided by Harlan...She brought feminine spunk to the Nashville Sound."

Howard also began touring and recording with Bill Anderson during this period. Both artists were not only on the same label but also were being booked by Hubert Long. On the road, the pair would sometimes sing together, often performing the song "I Know You're Married But I Love You Still". Anderson and Howard approached Owen Bradley with the proposal of recording duets. Bradley agreed and the pairing began with their first single in 1965. Their second single was 1967's "For Loving You". It became Howard's first and only single to reach the number one spot on the Billboard country chart. The duo's debut album of the same name reached number six on the country albums chart in 1968. Now a successful musical collaboration, Howard joined Anderson's roadshow and also became part of his syndicated television program. The show was mostly filmed in Windsor, Ontario, which meant Howard had to fly there every two weeks for tapings. Working with Anderson provided her with a steady source of income.

In 1968, Howard's oldest son Jimmy was drafted into the army to fight in the Vietnam War.Vietnam Veterans Memorial Fund site Howard wrote to him frequently, including one letter that was put to music. Her second son (Carter Howard) and Anderson inspired Howard to record it. Upon showing the letter to Owen Bradley, he insisted that she record it. Decca entitled the letter "My Son" and it was released as a single in 1968, reaching number 15 on the Billboard country chart. Howard received over 5,000 letters from soldiers and their families following its release. "They said they felt like it was for them," Howard commented. The song was later nominated for Best Female Country Vocal Performance at the Grammy Awards. Before the end of 1968, Jimmy Howard was killed in battle, aged 21.

In July 1969, Howard's self-titled seventh studio album was released and reached number 25 on the Billboard country albums survey. In 1970, Howard released an album of patriotic music entitled For God and Country. It was partially inspired by a poem her son Carter had written called "I Am". Put to music, the poem was featured on her album. Howard also decided to dedicate the album to Jimmy. "It was the most difficult album I'd ever recorded, yet one that would always be the closest to my heart," Howard wrote in 1987. Despite personal difficulties, Howard continued working as part of "The Bill Anderson Show". In March 1970, the duet released their second album entitled If It's All the Same to You. Its title track became a top ten country single. They continued recording and touring together through 1973. Their further singles reached the top ten on the Billboard country chart: "Someday We'll Be Together" (1970) and "Dis-Satisfied" (1971). By 1973, Howard's latest singles were reaching minor chart positions on the Billboard country survey. According to Howard, she approached Owen Bradley about the idea of working with a new producer at Decca. Bradley declined the proposition and Howard ultimately left the label in 1974.

1975–2020: New directions and slowing down
By 1975, Howard had left Bill Anderson's road and television shows. "I wasn't mentally or physically able to keep up the pace doing the show full time," she later wrote. Anderson replaced her with a newer artist named Mary Lou Turner and Howard was working by herself again. She had fewer concert dates than before and was working with pick-up bands who "would have made good electricians", according to Howard. Some nights, she performed with little to no instrumentation. During one booked engagement, she performed on the back of a flatbed truck. "Many nights I'd be so depressed and ashamed, I'd go back to the motel, cry and go to sleep," Howard wrote. During this time, she began touring with Johnny Cash and June Carter Cash as part of their roadshow. "It'll do you good," the Cashes said to her. Howard toured with the show nationally and internationally. This included performances in Hawaii and Australia. Not only touring together, Howard also joined Cash in the recording studio. She sang background vocals on some of his biggest hits. This included singing the line, "Mama sang tenor", on his 1969 hit "Daddy Sang Bass". She also was a background vocalist on Cash's 1963 hit "Ring of Fire".

Howard also returned to the recording studio. During this period, she was a neighbor of Nashville producer, Larry Butler, who produced her next studio album. Titled Sincerely, Jan Howard, it was issued on GRT Records. The album's first and only single to chart was "Seein' Is Believin'", which peaked outside the top 40 of the Billboard Hot Country Singles list. In 1977, she briefly signed with Con Brio Records, where she had three minor hits on the country chart. This included the song, "To Love a Rolling Stone" (1978), which was her final chart appearance. In the late 1970s, she also toured as part of Tammy Wynette's roadshow as both a background and lead vocalist.

In the early 1980s, record producer and friend Pete Drake asked Howard to be part of a new album series he was producing for Grand Ole Opry members. She agreed to the project and collaborated with Drake on her next studio album. Titled Stars of the Grand Ole Opry, the album was released by First Generation Records in April 1981. It contained re-recorded versions of Howard's hits and several new tracks. Howard continued recording during the decade. Her next studio album was released on AVI Records in 1983 called Tainted Love. The album's title track was a cover of the hit originally written by Ed Cobb. Cobb also shared production credits on the album's release. In 1985, Howard was part of a joint venture between MCA and Dot Records, which included several other veteran artists. From the venture, a self-titled studio album was released in 1985. Produced by Billy Strange, it was Howard's last studio release.

In the 1990s, Howard slowed down her singing career. Howard spoke of her career slow down and her continued passion for singing in her autobiography: "I love to sing and hope that, for a long time to come, God will give me the opportunity to do so. And when he tells me to quit, I hope I have the sense to follow His advice." While working occasionally, she mainly did performances as part of the Grand Ole Opry cast. In the 2000s, Howard was inducted into the Missouri Country Music Hall of Fame and released a boxed set of her recorded material. She has since appeared on albums by other artists. In 2007, she recorded a duet with Bill Anderson and Vince Gill for Anderson's studio release, Whisperin' Bluegrass. In 2017, Howard and Jessi Colter appeared on Jeannie Seely's studio album Written in Song, singing on the track "We're Still Hangin' in There, Ain't We Jessi". In 2019, she celebrated her 90th birthday at the Opry, making her the show's oldest living member.

Style and legacy

Howard's musical style was rooted in the country and Nashville Sound genres. Her music has been described as being part of the foundational landscape of country music. Stephen Thomas Erlewine of Allmusic spoke of her singing style in his review of The Very Best of Wynn Stewart and Jan Howard CD in 2004. "Howard is a strong,, straight-ahead, hardcore country singer, and the sides collected here are excellent, unheralded pure honky-tonk with a Bakersfield tinge." Robert K. Oermann commented on Howard's "brassy" singing style and noted that her Decca recordings were "downright gutsy", "sassy" and "self-assured." Oermann also spoke on Howard's legacy as an artist: "Jan opened the door for many more Nashville Sound stylists. Marion Worth, Margie Bowes, Connie Smith, Jeannie Seely and Connie Hall climbed the charts." 

Howard is also remembered for her commercial success. Sandra Brennan of Allmusic called her "one of the hottest female vocalists of the 1960s." Ken Burns called her "one of the most popular female country artists of the 1960s and early 1970s." Her legacy has also been mentioned in recent years. In 2018, she was ranked among the "100 Greatest Women of Country Music" in a poll by Country Universe. In 2005, Howard's single, "Evil on Your Mind", was listed as one of country music's "500 greatest singles" in the book Heartaches by the Number. In 1971, she became a member of the Grand Ole Opry and continued to make public appearances there until 2019.

Writing career and other professions
1966–1983: Songwriting
In addition to singing, Howard wrote songs for herself and others. One of her first released compositions was "Crying for Love", which appeared on her 1966 studio album Jan Howard Sings Evil on Your Mind. Howard's songs continued to appear on her studio albums over time. Self-penned songs appeared on the studio albums For God and Country, Love Is Like a Spinning Wheel, Sincerely, Jan Howard and Stars of the Grand Ole Opry. Songs she composed were also recorded by other artists. In 1966, she wrote "It's All Over But the Crying", which became a major hit for Kitty Wells. The same year, the song was given among the "Most Frequently Played Tracks" accolade from the BMI Awards. Howard later called the situation "ironic" because  her husband (Harlan Howard) was better known for songwriting. At the time of the awards dinner, the Howards had separated, but attended the event as a couple. 

Howard also penned songs with other artists. With Bill Anderson, she wrote "I Never Once Stopped Loving You", which became a major hit for Connie Smith. The pair also co-wrote "Dis-Satisfied", which they made a hit of their own as a duet partnership. Howard's son, Carter, was also given credit on its writing. The song appeared on their studio album Bill and Jan (Or Jan and Bill). Howard also self-penned "Love Is a Sometimes Thing," which was recorded and became a major hit for Anderson. She would also release it as a single herself around the same period. These compositions were also awarded BMI Songwriters Awards. In 1980, she collaborated with Tammy Wynette in writing the track "Only the Names Have Been Changed". The song appeared on Wynette's studio album Only Lonely Sometimes. Her last writing credit is on the track, "My Friend", a song that appeared on Howard's 1983 studio album Tainted Love.

1987–2020: Autobiography and other writing
For several years, friends told Howard that she should write an autobiography. In response, she said, "Yeah, it would make a great soap opera." Howard had written an outline for the book, but put it aside for three years before turning to it again. She later explained that she chose to continue writing the autobiography because she became suicidal. In 1979, she was visiting a friend in Florida. "It was a very bad time in my life. I was in Florida and, I didn't know whether I was going to walk into the ocean or not. And I can't swim," Howard said in 2003. Deciding not to end her life, she went back inside the house. She then sat on the floor and wrote a song called "My Story". Howard later threw the song away because it was full of "bitterness". "Once I started again, it was just like rolling back the years," she said in 2003.

The year of the book's release, Howard cancelled all her concert engagements to prepare for its completion. When officially released in 1987, the autobiography was titled Sunshine and Shadow: My Story. The book was published by Richardson & Steirman, a company based in New York City. Sunshine and Shadow received mostly positive reviews by critics upon its release. In their July 1987 review, Kirkus Reviews gave the book a positive commentary. Reviewers highlighted stories of Howard's interactions with other country artists and the recounting of her son's suicide. Kirkus concluded their review by stating, "Sure to be appreciated by die-hard country fans, and by any who seek a tale of victory over despair." Publishers Weekly gave their review of the release in August 1987. Reviewers of the book praised Howard's personal stories, but disliked the editing style of the book.

Also in the late 1980s, Howard explained that she was working on her first fiction short story and a novel. In a 2015 interview, Howard explained that she still writes a "little bit of everything" including songs, poems and short stories. Howard also said she had started three fiction novels that had yet to be completed. "I need to put those together, I need to go through them. And I found things in there that I forgot I wrote and I said 'oh, this is pretty good' or 'this is bad'. So right now I'm gonna put those all together and put them in a leather-bound book," Howard said.

Howard also wrote out her recipes that she used. She featured directions for her recipes on her official website, which were updated on a monthly basis. On her recipe page, website administrators stated, "Each month on this page we’ll be adding a favorite recipe or
two provided by Jan…so keep checking back."

Other professions and efforts
In the late 1970s, Howard obtained her real estate license for a local company in Hendersonville, Tennessee, called Lakeside Realtors. As a realtor, she sold several homes including one to local Nashville musician Jimmy Capps. Howard remained a real estate agent for only a short period of time. On her website, she commented that after a while, people would bring "sacks of tapes" for her to listen to rather than be potential clients. "My license is in retirement and will stay there, but I still pay my dues," Howard wrote on her fan page.

In 2002, she appeared with Faye Dunaway in the film Changing Hearts. Other performers were featured in the cast including Rita Coolidge and Jeannie Seely.

After her son was killed in the Vietnam War, Howard worked to support veterans returning from war, including with various organizations in support of the American military veterans. She worked previously with the Veterans Administration, Veterans of Foreign Wars, and the Vietnam Veteran organizations. Howard contributed to a campaign that helped raise funds for the Vietnam Veterans Memorial, which was finished in 1982. From Howard's efforts, she received the "Gold Medal of Merit Award" from the Veterans of Foreign Wars. "I never want to be in the forefront of anything like this, but it’s worth it to bring attention to those who gave so much. If it wasn’t for them, we wouldn’t have the life we enjoy as Americans," Howard commented in 2011. Since 1982, Howard was involved in veteran-related activities at Middle Tennessee State University, where her son was a former student. In 2017, she made an appearance at the university's veterans' memorial service. She was presented with a "Gold Star Brick" from the school for her work with veterans.

Personal life

Marriages
Howard was married four times. At the time of her first marriage to Mearle Wood, she was only 16 years old. The couple met when Howard was working at her local drugstore in West Plains, Missouri. He would frequently come by to say hello and have a soda. The two spent more time together, eventually becoming a couple and marrying. Howard later said that she did not want to marry Wood, but her mother encouraged their courtship. "I felt like I was dressing for a funeral. And in a way, I was. The funeral of my girlhood," she wrote. Her second marriage to Lowell "Smitty" Smith lasted only two years after discovering that he was a bigamist.

In her third marriage to Harlan Howard, Jan's three children legally were adopted by him and took on his last name. In the mid-1960s, the couple owned a publishing company in Nashville called "Wilderness Music". Together, they bought an older home, renovated it and turned it into a series of offices for the company. Jan later commented that Harlan took control of the Wilderness when they divorced. According to Harlan, the company and its music were his "brainchildren". Upset about the situation, Jan said to her divorce lawyers, "I don't want anything. Just the divorce." Following her divorce, she became closer to her divorce lawyer, Jack Norman. A licensed pilot, Norman took her on plane rides and also spent many nights at her home. The two became romantically involved while Norman was still married. Their affair carried on into the mid 1970s. In 1990, she remarried for a fourth time to Dr. Maurice Acree, Jr. Only married for a short period of time, Acree died in 2013, according to an obituary from The Tennessean.

Children
From her first marriage, Howard gave birth to three sons: Jimmy, Carter (Corky), and David. As a young child, Jimmy was hospitalized in critical condition with spinal meningitis. Within four weeks, he recovered from the illness. During the Vietnam War in 1968, Jimmy was drafted into the military. Once he received his draft notice, Carter volunteered for the army. "If Jimmy's going, I'm going," he said to Howard. After being sent to basic training, the military was supposed to let Jimmy come home, but they refused. Upset about the situation, Howard discussed the situation with her friend and country DJ, Ralph Emery. Through the assistance of Emery, Howard got in contact with Congressman Richard Fulton. Emery found Fulton at a restaurant at nine o'clock the same night when he contacted him.  Fulton got permission from the military to send Jimmy home for 21 days. In her autobiography, Howard recounted the phone call she received from Jimmy the day he came home, "Mom! What did you do? The Secretary of the Army himself called down here! My sergeant came and got me and said, 'Howard! Go call your mother, then be prepared to work you ass off!'" Howard also recalled Jimmy's nervousness as he prepared for Vietnam. The evening before his departure, he sat at her bedside explaining his nervousness and anxieties. The next evening, he flew out at three o'clock in the morning.

In October 1968, Jimmy was killed in action. She found out when she saw several friends arrive at the front door of her home. Realizing the reasons for them being there, she began screaming and crying. Howard remembered the days following Jimmy's death in her autobiography, going through the days and weeks by "forcing" herself to keep going. She had trouble eating and sleeping, taking pills on a regular basis to help her through the anxieties and grief. "I was crying when I woke up, and crying when I went to sleep," she wrote in 1987. One morning, Howard made the decision to dispose of all her medicine and continue on with her life. "As I walked into the den and saw the relief on Corky and David's faces, my efforts were worthwhile," she wrote.

Howard's youngest son, David, began abusing drugs in the years following Jimmy's death. Prior to this, he had been employed at the Opryland USA theme park, where he appeared as an actor in several shows, including a major role in the cast of the play I Hear America Singing. Howard then began noticing changes in his behavior, including coming home late at night and having symptoms of depression. When she would ask David, he would reply by saying that he was "just tired." She also noticed that he began associating with people who provided David with substances. She eventually had him see a psychiatrist for his personal setbacks, but only found out that he was using the time for other reasons. One morning in 1972, Howard found David in his bedroom dead from a self-inflicted gunshot wound. She recalled that the next several days were a "blur". Devastated by her son's suicide, she stayed in bed for days at a time. After many weeks of grieving, Howard cleaned out his room and sold his Volkswagen Beetle. "When everything was done, I took one last look around, walked out, and closed the door on the past. But it would never be locked," she wrote.

In the years following David and Jimmy's deaths, Howard's middle son Carter began working with military veterans. He also owned his own business and became a real estate broker in Nashville.

Other personal challenges and death
The psychological trauma of Howard's childhood affected her as she entered her adult years. After giving birth to her third child, she would cry uncontrollably. "There were many times my heart would pound so hard I thought it would pop out of my chest," Howard commented. Howard's sister took her to see a doctor, who explained that she was having a "nervous breakdown". To calm her anxieties, he prescribed Howard a strong pharmaceutical drug that she was told take four times per day. In the early 1960s, she was rushed to the hospital after experiencing intense bleeding. Doctors told her that after giving birth to a stillborn baby and a previous operation, Howard had a strong possibility of developing cancer if she did not have her uterus removed. Howard got surgery completed at the UCLA Medical Center in Los Angeles, and within three weeks she was back to a normal routine.

Her trauma followed her into her marriage with Harlan Howard. While married, her weight dropped below 97 pounds and she would pace their home at night. This prompted Harlan to institutionalize Jan. In her autobiography, she recounted being brought into a hospital room with doctors and nurses. She recalled that she was screaming and shouting until a nurse gave her a shot, which put her "six feet under". A doctor diagnosed her with having paroxysmal tachycardia and sent her home. He also ordered her to seek counseling services from a psychiatrist. According to her psychiatrist, she developed a series of phobias from the traumatic experiences in her childhood. After moving to Nashville, she continued having depressive episodes. One evening in 1962, she took a handful of sleeping pills and was rushed to the hospital. While at the hospital, her blood pressure dropped significantly low and was in critical condition. When she awoke, she recalled seeing Mother Maybelle Carter feeding her. "Little by little I felt stronger and knew, thank God, that I was going to live," she wrote.

Years later, Howard reflected on her life experiences: "One thing I want to make clear is that I'm not a martyr. I can't stand self-pity. I don't deserve and don't want any kind of pity...There are a lot of people who have gone through worse things than I have."

Howard died on March 28, 2020, fifteen days after her 91st birthday, in Gallatin, Tennessee. The cause of death was pneumonia. "We were all so lucky so many nights to hear her voice on stage and to catch up with her backstage. We’re all better for having had her in our lives," said Dan Rogers, Vice President of the Grand Ole Opry. She is buried at Spring Hill Cemetery, in Nashville.

DiscographySolo studio albums Sweet and Sentimental (1962)
 Jan Howard Sings Evil on Your Mind (1966)
 Bad Seed (1966)
 This Is Jan Howard Country (1967)
 Count Your Blessings, Woman (1968)
 Jan Howard (1969)
 For God and Country (1970)
 Rock Me Back to Little Rock (1970)
 Love Is Like a Spinning Wheel (1972)
 Sincerely, Jan Howard (1975)
 Stars of the Grand Ole Opry (1981)
 Tainted Love (1983)
 Jan Howard (1985)Studio albums with Bill Anderson'''
 For Loving You  (1968)
 If It's All the Same to You  (1970)
 Bill and Jan (Or Jan and Bill)  (1972)
 Singing His Praise  (1972)

Awards and nominations

!
|-
| rowspan="3"| 1960
| Billboard Country Awards
| Most Promising Female Vocalist
| 
| align="center"| 
|-
| Cashbox
| Most Promising Female Artist
| 
| align="center"| 
|-
| Jukebox Operators
| Most Promising Female Artist
| 
| align="center"| 
|-
| 1966
| BMI Awards
| Songwriter's Award – "It's All Over But the Crying"
| 
| align="center"| 
|-
| 1967
| Grammy Awards
| Best Female Country Vocal Performance – "Evil on Your Mind"
| 
| align="center"| 
|-
| 1968
| Country Music Association Awards
| Vocal Group of the Year 
| 
| align="center"| 
|-
| 1969
| Grammy Awards
| Best Female Country Vocal Performance – "My Son"
| 
| align="center"| 
|-
| rowspan="3"| 1970
| BMI Awards
| Songwriter's Award – "I Never Once Stopped Loving You"
| 
| align="center"| 
|-
| Country Music Association Awards
| Vocal Duo of the Year 
| 
| align="center"| 
|-
| Record World''
| Top Female Vocalist
| 
| align="center"| 
|-
| rowspan="2"| 1971
| rowspan="2"| BMI Awards
| Songwriters Award – "Love Is a Sometimes Thing"
| 
| align="center"| 
|-
| Songwriter's Award – "Dis-Satisfied" 
| 
| align="center"| 
|-
| 1992
| Tennessee Adjutant General's Award
| Distinguished Patriot Medal
| 
| align="center"| 
|-
| rowspan="2"| 2005
| Missouri Country Music Hall of Fame
| Induction
| 
| align="center"| 
|-
| rowspan="2"| R.O.P.E. Awards
| Ernest Tubb Humanitarian Award
| 
| align="center"| 
|-
| 2013
| Songwriter Award
| 
| align="center"| 
|-
|}

References

Footnotes

Books

External links

 
 Jan Howard profile  at the Country Music Hall of Fame and Museum
 Profiles of country artists and their stories from the Vietnam War
 

1929 births
2020 deaths
American autobiographers
American country singer-songwriters
American women country singers
American veterans' rights activists
Capitol Records artists
Challenge Records artists
Country musicians from Missouri
Decca Records artists
Grand Ole Opry members
People from West Plains, Missouri
Singer-songwriters from Missouri
Women autobiographers
21st-century American singers
21st-century American women singers